Batuhan Kırdaroğlu (born 10 September 2000) is a Turkish professional footballer who plays as a midfielder for Serik Belediyespor on loan from Göztepe.

Professional career
On 3 July 2019, Kırdaroğlu signed his first professional contract with Göztepe. Kırdaroğlu made his professional debut in a 0-0 Süper Lig tie with Çaykur Rizespor on 15 September 2019.

References

External links

TFF Profile
Mackolik Profile

2000 births
People from Gebze
Living people
Turkish footballers
Association football midfielders
Pendikspor footballers
Göztepe S.K. footballers
Altınordu F.K. players
Menemenspor footballers
Süper Lig players
TFF First League players
TFF Second League players